Joseph Anthony Burns (born 6 September 1989) is an Australian cricketer who plays for the Australia national cricket team, Melbourne Stars in the Big Bash League and Queensland in Australian domestic cricket.

Early life
Burns' parents were both school teachers. He was a good cricketer as a child, though not a prodigy. "I finished uni, thinking I was going to get a job in business," he said. "I didn't play cricket with the ambition of playing professionally … but you make a few runs, go up the grades, and it all happened so quickly from there." Burns grew up in Brisbane's northern suburbs and attended Nudgee College.

Domestic and T20 career
Burns made an exceptional start in his Sheffield Shield debut against South Australia, scoring 140 in February 2011.

In the 2011–12 Sheffield Shield season, Burns was the fifth highest run scorer in the Australian first-class cricket season, scoring 781 runs. This was followed by 587 runs in the 2012–13 Sheffield Shield season.

Burns performances resulted in a call in early 2013 up to the Australia A to face the touring party from England, where he scored 114 in a one-day game, not long after being named the Bradman Young Cricketer of the Year.

Burns continued his good form on his return to Australia and was top scorer for the Brisbane Heat in their win over Perth Scorchers in the final of the 2012–13 Big Bash League season.

Burns performances brought him to the attention of Leicestershire who signed him as a replacement for their overseas player, Ramnaresh Sarwan, between May and August of the 2013 County season. This was curtailed in July, when a hip injury forced Burns to end his spell in England and return home to Queensland.

Burns deputised for the Middlesex captain Adam Voges during the 2015 English season.

In December 2017, Burns scored his maiden first-class double century, batting for Queensland against South Australia in the 2017–18 Sheffield Shield season. In March 2018, Cricket Australia named Burns in their Sheffield Shield team of the year. In 2019, he signed with Lancashire ahead of the 2019 County Championship in England, but returned to Australia for personal reasons after making only one appearance.

In April 2021, Burns was signed by Lahore Qalandars to play in the rescheduled matches in the 2021 Pakistan Super League.

International career
In December 2014, Burns was selected to play for Australia in the Boxing Day Test against India at the Melbourne Cricket Ground following an injury to all rounder Mitchell Marsh. He batted at number 6 and scored 13 runs before being caught behind off Umesh Yadav.

Burns then managed to score two half centuries (58 and 66) in his second Test at the Sydney Cricket Ground.

In November 2015, Burns made his first Test century against New Zealand at the Gabba, bringing up his century with two consecutive sixes off the bowling of off-spinner Mark Craig.

Burns made his One Day International debut for Australia against Ireland on 27 August 2015 in Stormont, Belfast, Northern Ireland. In his ODI debut, he scored a half century.

Home and away Test series against the West Indies and New Zealand in 2015–16 produced Burns two more centuries, but lean scores followed in Sri Lanka in the latter half of 2016 which resulted in Burns being dropped after the Hobart Test against South Africa in November 2016.

Recalls
On 28 March 2018, Burns was urgently recalled to the Test side following the suspensions of Steve Smith, David Warner and Cameron Bancroft for ball tampering during the third Test of the Australian 2018 Tour of South Africa.

In February 2019, Burns was again recalled to the Test squad for the two match series against Sri Lanka, and opened the batting in both matches. In the first match, across both Sri Lanka innings, Burns fielded at slips and took three catches. In the second match, in Canberra, Burns scored his fourth Test century, hitting 180 in the first innings.

In June 2019, Burns was diagnosed with a fatigue disorder, dating back to a viral infection that he suffered in October 2018. He recovered, and was recalled in the home Test series against Pakistan in November 2019, scoring 97 in Australia's only innings.

Burns went on to play the subsequent three Test home series against New Zealand in December 2019 and January 2020, scoring a half century in the first Test at Perth. In April 2020, Cricket Australia awarded Burns with a central contract ahead of the 2020–21 season.

References

External links
 

1989 births
Living people
Brisbane Heat cricketers
Melbourne Stars cricketers
Glamorgan cricketers
Leicestershire cricketers
Middlesex cricketers
Australia Test cricketers
Australia One Day International cricketers
Australian cricketers
Cricketers from Brisbane
Queensland cricketers
People educated at St Joseph's College, Nudgee